The Holy Venerable Theodosius of Tarnovo (Teodosiy Tarnovski) (died 1363) was a high-ranking 14th-century Bulgarian cleric and hermit. He is credited with establishing hesychasm in the Second Bulgarian Empire. A disciple of Gregory of Sinai, Theodosius founded the Kilifarevo monastery and school near the then-Bulgarian capital Tarnovo and took an important part in the condemning of various heresies during the reign of Tsar Ivan Alexander of Bulgaria.

Theodosius died in 1363 at the Monastery of St Mamant in Constantinople. He went to the Byzantine capital on a visit to his fellow, Patriarch Callistus I, who consequently wrote a long passional about Theodosius. Among Theodosius' disciples was Patriarch Evtimiy, the last head of the medieval Bulgarian Orthodox Church, as well as a writer and hesychast.

Namesakes
St. Theodosius Nunatak in Antarctica is named after Theodosius of Tarnovo.

References
 

Bulgarian Christian religious leaders
1300s births
1363 deaths
14th-century Bulgarian people
14th-century Christian saints
People from Veliko Tarnovo
Hesychasts
Medieval Bulgarian saints
Year of birth unknown
Disciples of Gregory of Sinai